The siege of Babylon in 689 BC took place after Assyrian king Sennacherib's victory over the Elamites at the Battle of River Diyala. Although the Assyrians had suffered heavy casualties at the river, they had beaten the Elamites such that the Babylonians now stood alone. Sennacherib then successfully besieged Babylon for up to fifteen months and destroyed it.

Assault

King Sennacherib had lost his eldest son in the revolt and had also suffered heavy losses. Prior to this, most Assyrian attempts at punishing Babylon were lenient, due to a strong pro-Babylon presence in Assyrian governmental ranks. However, Sennacherib, now an old man with nothing to lose, found no pity in his heart and sacked Babylon. Large amounts of desecration took place, even by Assyrian standards. The destruction was so much so, it may have been a factor in Sennacherib's murder by two of his sons, eight years after the destruction. Another of his sons, Esarhaddon, succeeded him and endeavored to compensate Babylonia for his father's sacrilege by releasing Babylonian exiles and rebuilding Babylon.

References 

Babylon
Babylon
Babylon
7th century BC
Sennacherib